The Homburg Cup  its original name was a tennis event held from 1894 through 1935 in Bad Homburg vor der Höhe, Germany on outdoor Clay court's.

History
The  Homburg Cup tournament was first held in 1894 played at the Bad Homburg Tennis Club, Bad Homburg vor der Höhe, Germany and usually August. The Homburg Cup was organised by the 1st President of the German Tennis Federation, Carl August von der Meden, the early staging of this event attracted some of the most well known aristocracy in Europe such as the, Emperor of Germany, Crown Prince of Greece, and the Duke of Cambridge numerous other aristocrats appeared every year which generated significant press coverage for the event, prize money that was on offer was said to be  substantial at the time which was probably why it was considered one of the most important  and prestigious  early pre-open era tournaments in continental Europe and Germany along with German Championships known then for its ability to attract the best players in the world throughout its early period certainly up to the beginning of World War I. It was an open event and featured the likes of the Arthur Gore, Anthony Wilding, Joshua Pim Laurence and Reginald Doherty, A Harold Mahony and Max Décugis its lasted 41 years until 1935 the event featured men's doubles, women's singles and doubles and mixed doubles  competition.

Champions
Notes: Challenge round: The final round of a tournament, in which the winner of a single-elimination phase faces the previous year's champion, who plays only that one match. The challenge round was used in the early history of tennis (from 1877 through 1921) in some tournaments not all. * Indicates challenger

Men's singles

Women's singles

Notes

References
 Lawn Tennis and Badminton Magazines, 1896–1901, Amateur Sports Publishing Co. Ltd, London, UK.
 Lawn Tennis and Croquet Magazines, 1901–1920, Amateur Sports Publishing Co. Ltd, London, UK.
 Tennis:Cultural History, Gillmeister, Heiner, A&C Black, 1998, .

See also
History of tennis

External links
https://app.thetennisbase.com/Homburg Cup Roll of Honour

Clay court tennis tournaments
Defunct tennis tournaments in Germany